Viliami Tungī Mailefihi CBE (1 November 1888 – 20 July 1941) was a Tongan high chieftain and Prince Consort of Queen Sālote Tupou III. He served as Prime Minister of Tonga from 1923 until his death in 1941.

Biography 

Prince Tungi was the son of Siaosi Tukuʻaho (Lord Tungi of Tatakamotonga), who served as Prime Minister of Tonga from to 1890 to 1893. Tungī's grandfather was Tungī Halatuituia. The line of Tungī chiefs hailed from the exalted village of Tatakamotonga.  They were descended from the defunct line of Tuʻi Haʻatakalaua High Chiefs, who in that time were more or less seen as deputy rulers under the Tuʻi Tong Kings. As such, they had a fiercely loyal following among the people of Muʻa if not from the whole Hahake district of Tongatapu Island. His mother, Lady Mele Siuʻilikutapu was the granddaughter of the Tuʻi Vavaʻu: Fīnau ʻUlukālala III (Tuapasi). As the nephew of the young and unmarried King Siaosi Tupou II,  Tungi was the Heir-to-the-Throne, until the King's marriage and the birth of his first child, The Princess Sālote, in 1900. In 1911 Prince Tungi represented the Tongan King at the Coronation of King George V in London.

Tungī was educated at Tupou College, Tonga and Newington College, Sydney, commencing in 1896, aged nine. He was one of seven Tongan nobles to attend Newington at the time. He was a follower of the Wesleyan Methodist Church.

He was selected by King Siaosi Tupou II to marry his elder daughter and heiress presumptive, Princess Sālote. The King favored this match even though she was 12 years younger than Tungi.  The Christian wedding ceremony took place on 19 September 1916. The traditional Tongan matrimonial ceremony (known as the Tu'uvala) was celebrated on 21 September. In less than a year, King Siaosi Tupou II would die and his daughter (The Princess Sālote) would be crowned as the regnant Queen of Tonga.

The opening years of Queen Salote's reign were fraught with political difficulties. There was a schism between the two branches of the Methodist Church; and a republican movement threatened to unseat the fledgling monarch. The personality and high status of Prince Tungi helped to elevate the esteem of the people toward their young queen.

One of the most eminent accomplishments (contributed by Queen Salote and Prince Tungi)  was the births of their children. Between them, The Queen and her Consort carried the blood of all three ancient royal dynasties: the Tu'i Tonga, the Tu'i Ha'atakalaua and the Tu'i Kanokupolu. Their son (The Prince Tuku'aho) died in 1936.  However, the other two sons (The Prince Taufa'ahau and The Prince Sione) carried and passed on the combined bloodlines of the three ancient royal dynasties.

Prince Tungi served as his wife's Prime Minister from 1923 until his death in 1941. His own experience helped him to train The Queen in the vocation of kingship and government.  His death in 1941 during the Second World War was a devastating blow to Queen Salote and yet like Britain's Queen Victoria, she learned to serve her people in spite of her grief and loss.

Family tree

References 

|-

1888 births
1941 deaths
Tongan royal consorts
Tungi
Tungi Mailefihi
Tungi Mailefihi
Tongan Methodists
20th-century Tongan people
19th-century Tongan people
Honorary Commanders of the Order of the British Empire
Prime Ministers of Tonga
Governors of Vavaʻu